The following are international rankings of Syria.

Demographics

Economy 

 The Wall Street Journal and the Heritage Foundation: Index of Economic Freedom 2008, ranked 144 out of 157 countries.
 International Monetary Fund: GDP (nominal) per capita 2007, ranked 111 out of 182 countries.
 International Monetary Fund: GDP (nominal) 2007, ranked 63 out of 181 countries.
 World Economic Forum: Global Competitiveness Index 2008-2009, ranked 78 out of 134 countries.

Environment 
 Yale University: Environmental Sustainability Index 2021 ranked,50 out of 149

Geography 

 Total area ranked 88 out of 233 countries.

Globalization 

 A.T. Kearney/Foreign Policy Magazine: Globalization Index 2007, ranked 109 out of 122 countries.

Military 

 Center for Strategic and International Studies: active troops ranked 22 out of 166 countries
 Institute for Economics and Peace  Global Peace Index ranked92 out of 144

Politics 

 Transparency International: Corruption Perceptions Index 2008, ranked 147 out of 180 countries.
 Reporters Without Borders: Worldwide press freedom index 2008, ranked 159 out of 173 countries.
 The Economist Democracy Index 2008, ranked 156 out of 167 countries
 Economist Intelligence Unit Shoe-Thrower's index ranked 4

Society 
 United Nations: Human Development Index 2010, ranked 111 out of 169 countries
 Gallup Global Wellbeing Index 2010, ranked 122 out of 155

Technology 
World Economic Forum Networked Readiness Index 2007–2008, ranked 110 out of 127 countries

References 

Syria